Muthunaickenpatti is a panchayat village in Omalur taluk, Salem, Tamil Nadu, India. It is the second most populous village in Omalur taluk.

Geography
It has an average elevation of 278m(912 ft). The closest town is Omalur 5 km away and 16 km away from the district headquarter Salem. The Lake Nainathaal is located in Muthunaickenpatti.

Demographics
As of 2011 census, Muthunaickenpatti  has a total population of 13192 people with 6976 males and 6216 females with 10.01% of population are under the age of 6. The average sex ratio is 891 and the child sex ratio is 901. The average literacy rate of 64.44% with males constituting 72.60% and females constituting 55.28%. It has 3473 households.

Education

Schools
 Government higher secondary school, Muthunaickenpatti
 G.R. Matriculation School
 Government primary school

References

 

Villages in Salem district